Erkki Marttinen (18 May 1926 – 1 November 2004) was a Finnish swimmer. He competed in the men's 100 metre backstroke at the 1952 Summer Olympics.

References

External links
 

1926 births
2004 deaths
Finnish male backstroke swimmers
Olympic swimmers of Finland
Swimmers at the 1952 Summer Olympics
Place of birth missing